Wilson Akakpo (born 10 October 1992) is a Ghanaian-born Togolese professional footballer who plays for Al-Quwa Al-Jawiya and the Togolese national team as a defender.

International career
Born in Ghana and of Togolese descent, on 22 September 2017 Akakpo was called up to Togo squad by coach Claude Le Roy for their friendly fixtures. He made his first appearance with Togo on 18 November 2018 against Algeria in a 2019 Africa Cup of Nations qualification match, coming in as an early substitute for injured Sadat Ouro-Akoriko.

References

External links
 

Currently club Al Najaf FC Iraq

1992 births
Living people
People from Volta Region
Togolese footballers
Togo international footballers
Ghanaian footballers
Togolese people of Ghanaian descent
Association football defenders
Togolese expatriate footballers
Expatriate footballers in Egypt
Togolese expatriate sportspeople in Saudi Arabia
Expatriate footballers in Saudi Arabia
Ghana Premier League players
Egyptian Premier League players
Saudi First Division League players
Berekum Chelsea F.C. players
Al Masry SC players
Al Ittihad Alexandria Club players
Al-Shoulla FC players
21st-century Togolese people